Indiana's 9th congressional district is a congressional district in the U.S. state of Indiana. Located in south-central and southeastern Indiana, the district stretches from the south suburbs of Indianapolis to the Indiana side of the Louisville metropolitan area. The district's largest city is Bloomington, home to Indiana University. It was represented by Ben Wyatt in the NBC television show Parks and Recreation.

The district is currently represented by Erin Houchin, first elected in 2022.

Election results from presidential races

Counties in the district
Indiana counties within the 9th Congressional District, and the major cities within the county:

As of 2023, Indiana's 9th congressional district is located in southeastern Indiana. It encompasses Brown, Clark, Dearborn, Decatur, Floyd, Franklin, Harrison, Jackson, Jefferson, Jennings, Lawrence, Monroe, Ohio, Ripley, Scott, Switzerland, and Washington Counties, and most of Bartholomew County.

Bartholomew County is split between this district and the 6th district. They are partitioned by Indiana County Rd West 300 South and Indiana County Rd 400 South. The 9th district takes in part of the city of Columbus, and the 3 townships of Jackson, Ohio, and Wayne, as well as most of the township of Sand Creek.

Largest Cities
Cities in this district with more than 10,000 residents.
  Bloomington - 79,168
 Jeffersonville - 49,447
 New Albany - 37,841
 Clarksville - 22,333
 Bedford - 13,413

List of members representing the district

Recent election results

2002

2004

2006

2008

2010

2012

2014

2016

2018

2020

Historical district boundaries

See also

Indiana's congressional districts
List of United States congressional districts

References

 United States House of Representatives, Office of the Clerk

 Congressional Biographical Directory of the United States 1774–present

External links

09
1843 establishments in Indiana
Brown County, Indiana
Clark County, Indiana
Crawford County, Indiana
Floyd County, Indiana
Harrison County, Indiana
Jackson County, Indiana
Johnson County, Indiana
Lawrence County, Indiana
Monroe County, Indiana
Morgan County, Indiana
Orange County, Indiana
Scott County, Indiana
Washington County, Indiana
Constituencies established in 1843